(), was a Companion of the Islamic prophet Muhammad whom Islamic tradition regards as one of the ten earliest converts to Islam. Born as a slave in Mecca, he later became a swordsmith and was able to build up enough of a reputation to eventually get freed by his master.

His name , which literally means 'afflicted by a speech impairment', likely points to someone who did not master Arabic like a native speaker would.

As a slave and early convert Khabbab suffered heavily from the persecution of early Muslims by the Meccan elite, which would lead later tradition to see him as a symbol of Islam's power to emancipate and to reward steadfast belief regardless of origin or status. In 622 Khabbab was able to escape Mecca by participating in the migration of Muhammad and the early Muslims to Medina. He fought at the Battle of Badr in 624 and was highly regarded by Umar during his reign in 634–644. He died a rich man, in the year 657/658 (37 AH) or 659/660 (39 AH), and was buried outside of a village near Kufa where he had his estate. His son Abd Allah ibn Khabbab was murdered by the Kharijites.

Khabbab later figured as a transmitter of reports about the prophet Muhammad that were collected by the 8th/9th-century scholars of hadith, thirteen of which appeared in the Six Books recognized as most autoritative by Sunni Muslims.

References

Sources

Further reading
 (a paper about non-Qurayshis who took a prominent place in pre-Islamic and early Islamic Mecca, including Khabbab ibn al-Aratt)

Companions of the Prophet
580s births
650s deaths